Eurycheilichthys limulus is a species of armored catfish endemic to Brazil, where it is found in the upper Jacuí River basin.  The habitat at the type locality of E. limulus is a small river about 3–5 metres wide with moderate water current, bottom comprising some rocks but mostly sand and a large amount of marginal vegetation. These fishes live among leaves and stalks.  This species grows to a length of  SL.

References 

Otothyrinae
Catfish of South America
Freshwater fish of Brazil
Endemic fauna of Brazil
Taxa named by Roberto Esser dos Reis
Taxa named by Scott Allen Schaefer
Fish described in 1998